The one-spot moray (Gymnothorax monostigma) is a moray eel found in coral reefs in the Pacific and Indian Oceans. It was first named by Charles Tate Regan in 1909.

References

monostigma
Fish described in 1909